Luebo Airport  is an airstrip serving the town of Luebo in Kasai Province, Democratic Republic of the Congo.

See also

 List of airports in the Democratic Republic of the Congo

References

External links
 FallingRain - Luebo Airport
 
 HERE Maps - Luebo
 OpenStreetMap - Luebo
 OurAirports - Luebo

Airports in Kasaï Province